Georgi "Gesha" Ivanov (born 22 May 1967) is a Bulgarian former footballer and coach.

Honours

Player
Levski Sofia
 A Group (2): 1993–94, 1994–95
 Bulgarian Cup (1): 1993–94

References

External links
 Profile at LevskiSofia.info

1967 births
Living people
Bulgarian footballers
Bulgarian football managers
PFC Spartak Varna players
PFC Cherno More Varna players
PFC Ludogorets Razgrad players
PFC Dobrudzha Dobrich players
PFC Levski Sofia players
PFC Slavia Sofia players
PFC Spartak Pleven players
First Professional Football League (Bulgaria) players
Sportspeople from Varna, Bulgaria
Association football midfielders
Association football defenders